Lisa Gabriele is a Canadian novelist, television producer and journalist. She was the show runner for Dragons' Den. 2006–2012.

Gabriele is the author of The Winters", "Tempting Faith DiNapoli and The Almost Archer Sisters, all national bestsellers. 'Tempting Faith DiNapoli' was developed as a TV series by Insight Productions. Her upcoming novel, The Winters, a reimagining of Daphne du Maurier's Rebecca, was published in Canada, the U.K., Portugal, and the U.S. in the fall of 2018.

In February 2013, it was revealed on The Current that Lisa Gabriele is the true identity of the pseudonym L. Marie Adeline, author of the erotic novel S.E.C.R.E.T., published in 31 countries. It has since been turned into a trilogy, the second instalment published in October 2013, and the third, Spring of 2014. It was also revealed she is the ghost writer for both Kevin O'Leary of Shark Tank and Dragons' Den and Jim Treliving who also stars on the show.

Her essays and fiction have appeared in several anthologies, including Dave Eggers' The Best American Nonrequired Reading, Sex and Sensibility, Don't You Forget About Me, When I Was a Loser, and 2033: The Future of Misbehavior. She lives in Toronto, where she graduated from the Ryerson School of Journalism in 1992. Her short story, "The Guide to Being a Groupie", was selected for inclusion in the Norton Anthology of Western Literature.

Her writing has appeared in the New York Times Magazine, the Washington Post, Vice magazine, Salon, Glamour, among other publications, and she was a regular contributor to Nerve. She has worked as a director and/or producer for CBC, for programs such as Dragons' Den, The Week the Women Went, and she wrote the CBC radio program The Current from 2003 to 2006. As well, she has produced or directed programs for the History Channel, the Life Network and Slice TV. She's been nominated for four Geminis, and has won twice. She won the Screen Award for best Reality TV show in 2013. She was head of development for Proper Television from 2014 to 2016, and worked on Masterchef Canada in 2015 and 2017. She heads development at Antica Productions, 2019.

References
https://www.thestar.com/Entertainment/article/576558

http://www.lisagabriele.com

https://www.theglobeandmail.com/servlet/story/RTGAM.20090108.wbkarcher10/BNStory/globebooks/

http://www.winnipegfreepress.com/entertainment/books/great_novel_full_of_surprises_full_of_love.html

Canadian women novelists
Canadian television producers
Canadian women television producers
Year of birth missing (living people)
Living people
21st-century Canadian novelists
21st-century Canadian women writers
Canadian erotica writers
Women erotica writers